Lal Bazar is a locality in the municipal committee of Srinagar in the Indian administered union territory of Jammu and Kashmir. It comes under the Zadibal constituency of the Srinagar Legislative Assembly. Lal Bazar is a well known posh area in the upper downtown area of Srinagar. The Pincode of Lal Bazar is 190011 & 190023. Considered amongst the best residential areas in Srinagar the area has many amenities such as major banks and schools along with University of Kashmir,NIT Srinagar, Institute of Technology, University of Kashmir, Zakura Campus, Sher - i - Kashmir Institute of Medical Sciences close by, roughly 2 km from Lal Bazar.

Location

Lal Bazar is about way from the city centre of Srinagar.

Sub Divisions
New Housing Colony Near Police Station
Umar Colony A - B - C
Mughal Street
Molvi Stop
Kanitar
Broadway Street
Rose Lane
Friends Lane
Green Lane
Botshah Mohalla
Botshah Colony
Alamdar Colony A & B
Bota Kadal
Sikh Bagh
Bagwanpora
Sheikh Hamza Colony
Shoor
Gousia Colony
Mughal Lane-Alamdar Colony

Schools 
Several prestigious and well known private schools of the city are located in this area.
 G.D. Goenka Public School, Lal Bazar
 Radiant Public School (R.P School), Lal Bazar
 Crescent Public School, Lal Bazar
 Eve's Garden Educational Institute, Lal Bazar
 Green Woods High School, Sikh Bagh - Lal Bazar
 Vision School of Education, Lal Bazar
 The Legends School of Education, Lal Bazar is also located in this area.

See also 
Mughal Road
Dal Lake
Hazratbal shrine
Rajbagh
Kashmir University
Srinagar

References

Cities and towns in Srinagar district
Srinagar
Neighbourhoods in Srinagar